George Marsh may refer to:

 George Marsh (martyr) (1515–1555), English Protestant martyr
 George Marsh (Medal of Honor) (died 1915), American soldier who fought in the American Civil War
 George Marsh (Australian footballer) (1882–1965), Australian footballer for Collingwood
 George Marsh (footballer, born 1998), English association footballer
 George Marsh (sport shooter) (born 1938), Canadian Olympic shooter
 George Marsh (musician) (died 1962), American jazz drummer
 George Marsh (architect) (1921–1988), English architect
 George Perkins Marsh (1801–1882), American diplomat and philologist
 George T. Marsh, Canadian politician, mayor of Regina, Saskatchewan in 1895
 George A. Marsh, a three-masted schooner built in Michigan in 1882

Marsh, George